Karaağaç is a town in İskenderun district of Hatay Province, Turkey. At  it is very close both to İskenderun and it is almost at the coast of  Mediterranean Sea. The population of Karaağaç was 20,459  as of 2012. After a considerable increase in population, in 1986 four of these villages voted to be united as a township. Now the former villages are the quarters of the town.

References

Populated places in Hatay Province
Towns in Turkey
İskenderun District
Populated coastal places in Turkey